Petro Zyma is a government official who served as a chief of the Security Service of Ukraine in Sevastopol (2012–2014) until the Russian annexation of Crimea and who defected to the Russian Federation, becoming a Federal Security Service official.

Besides being accused of treason, Zyma is under suspicion of involvement in killing civilians during the Euromaidan events in February 2014.

References

1970 births
Living people
People from Bakhmut
Security Service of Ukraine officers
Fugitives wanted by Ukraine
Ukrainian defectors
People of the annexation of Crimea by the Russian Federation
Pro-Russian people of the 2014 pro-Russian unrest in Ukraine